Lukh may refer to:
Lukh, Gilan, Iran
Lukh, South Khorasan, a village in Iran
Lukh, Russia, an urban locality (a settlement) in Lukhsky District of Ivanovo Oblast, Russia
Lukh (river), a river in Russia